The 1990 Associate Members' Cup Final, known as the Leyland DAF Cup for sponsorship reasons, was the 7th final of the domestic football cup competition for teams from the Third Division and Fourth Division. The final was played at Wembley Stadium, London on 20 May 1990, and was contested by Tranmere Rovers and Bristol Rovers. Tranmere won the match 2–1, with Ian Muir and Jim Steel scoring the goals for the winning team.

Match details

External links
Official website

Associate Members' Cup Final 1990
EFL Trophy Finals
Associate Members' Cup Final 1990
Associate Members' Cup Final 1990